Malassezia vespertilionis is a species of yeast-like fungus that grows on the skin of bats. It was described as a new species in 2018. The holotype was obtained from a swab of wing skin of a hibernating northern long-eared bat (Myotis septentrionalis) collected in Wisconsin. The species epithet vespertilionis uses the Latin vespertilio (bat) to refer to the host.

Additional isolates were collected from various bat species in several locations in the United States – Alabama, California, Kentucky, Missouri, New York, Pennsylvania, and Wisconsin. Other bat species that harbor the fungus are the California myotis (Myotis californicus), the fringed myotis (Myotis thysanodes), the Indiana bat (Myotis sodalis), the little brown bat (Myotis lucifugus), the gray bat (Myotis grisescens), and the silver-haired bat (Lasionycteris noctivagans). The fungus appears to be fairly common on bats found in the United States, occurring in 28% of 264 individuals sampled.

Description
The cells have an ellipsoid or ovoid shape (in rare instances they are spherical), ranging in size from 2–3 by 2–4 μm, although 2 by 3 μm is the usual size.

References

Basidiomycota
Fungi described in 2018
Fungi of the United States
Yeasts
Fungi without expected TNC conservation status